Primitive Race is the first full-length album by Industrial supergroup Primitive Race. Created by Chris Kniker, the project has regular appearances by Graham Crabb, Erie Loch, and Mark Gemini Thwaite. A few more additional contributors include Tommy Victor, Dave “Rave” Ogilvie, Kourtney Klein, Mark “3KSK” Brooks, Josh Bradford, Andi Sex Gang.

Track listing

Personnel 
 Chris Kniker - Bass, Programmed By, Noises
 Mark Brooks - Guitar, Synth, Programmed By
 Mark Gemini Thwaite - Guitar, Synth, Programmed By, Bass
 Erie Loch - Guitar, Synth, Programmed By, Bass, Vocals
 Kourtney Klein - Synthesizer, Programmed By
 Dave Ogilvie - Synthesizer, Programmed By, Noises
 Josh Bradford - Vocals
 Tommy Victor - Vocals
 Graham Crabb - Vocals, Synth, Programmed By

References

Primitive Race albums
Metropolis Records albums